Antiochtha angustivalva is a moth in the family Lecithoceridae. It was described by Kyu-Tek Park in 2006. It is found in northern Vietnam.

References

Moths described in 2006
Antiochtha